Jonesia is a genus of Actinomycetota.

References

Micrococcales
Soil biology
Bacteria genera